Howl is an EP and first release by American doom metal band Howl. It was originally released independently in 2008, and was reissued on July 21, 2009, following the band's signing with Relapse Records.

Track listing

Credits
 Vincent Hausman - guitar, vocals
 Andrea Black - guitar
 Robert Icaza - bass
 Timmy St. Amour - drums

References

2008 EPs
Relapse Records EPs